On May 7, 2017, American teenager Brooke Skylar Richardson (born March 9, 1999) gave birth at home alone and buried her newborn daughter in the backyard of her parents' house in Carlisle, Ohio. Two months later she described what had happened to her doctor, who informed police. Richardson was charged with but acquitted of aggravated murder, child endangerment and involuntary manslaughter, and was only found guilty of serious mistreatment of a corpse. She was subsequently given three years of probation, which was ended early by the court.

Brooke Skylar Richardson

Personal life 
Richardson attended Carlisle High School in Ohio, where she was a cheerleader.

Pregnancy and birth 
Richardson became pregnant during her senior year of high school. After her first gynecology appointment, Richardson was told that she was pregnant and would be giving birth in a few weeks. After hearing this news, Brooke cried out loud, stating how she was not prepared to have a baby. She begged the gynecologist for birth control, despite her pregnancy. She kept her pregnancy a secret from her friends and family. Before giving birth, she searched up “how to not have a baby” and “how to get rid of a baby" on her laptop using the internet. After senior prom, on May 7, 2017, she gave birth to the child in the bathroom of her parents' house, and subsequently buried the baby in the backyard. The next morning at the gym, she texted her mother, "I'm literally speechless with how happy I am. My belly is back omg". For around two months, the baby remained buried, and she did not tell anyone else, until another routine visit to the gynecologist for more birth control pills, where she admitted to burying the baby in the backyard after giving birth.

Investigation 
The infant's skeletal remains were dug up from the backyard on July 14, 2017, and an autopsy determined that the baby's bones were partially charred and died of "homicidal violence".

When interviewed by Police, Richardson was, at first, hesitant about burning the baby, but after a second police interview, she stated, "I tried to cremate the baby."

Trial 

The prosecution alleged that Richardson had burned her newborn child's body before burying it in the back yard of her home.

During the trial a forensic expert, who had previously determined the newborn's remains had been charred, revised that opinion and recanted their earlier evidence.

The defense argued that Richardson was subjected to an overzealous interrogation because of the baby burning theory. A psychologist diagnosed her with dependent personality disorder and testified that this disorder could have led her to make a false confession.

After the trial, a juror said that Richardson was not convicted on the more serious charges because the "prosecutors did not prove their case."

See also 
 Kerry Babies case - A similar case from Ireland.
 Concealment of birth
 Stillbirth
 Teenage pregnancy

References 

1999 births
Living people